Batrachomoeus is a genus of toadfishes.

Species
The recognized species in this genus are:
 Batrachomoeus dahli (Rendahl (de), 1922) (Dahl's frogfish)
 Batrachomoeus dubius (J. White, 1790) (eastern frogfish)
 Batrachomoeus occidentalis Hutchins, 1976 (western frogfish)
 Batrachomoeus rubricephalus Hutchins, 1976 (pinkhead frogfish)
 Batrachomoeus trispinosus (Günther, 1861) (three-spined frogfish)

References

Batrachoididae